The 2013 Metro Atlantic Athletic Conference baseball tournament was held from May 23 through 26.  The top four regular season finishers of the league's teams met in the double-elimination tournament held at Arm & Hammer Park in Trenton, New Jersey.  Canisius, the tournament champion, earned the conference's automatic bid to the 2013 NCAA Division I baseball tournament.

Seeding
The top four teams were seeded one through four based on their conference winning percentage.  They then played a double-elimination tournament. Canisius claimed the third seed over Siena by tiebreaker.

Results

All-Tournament Team
The following players were named to the All-Tournament Team.

Most Valuable Player
Jesse Puscheck was named Tournament Most Valuable Player.  Puscheck was a designated hitter for Canisius.

References

Metro Atlantic Athletic Conference Baseball Tournament
Metro Atlantic Athletic Conference baseball tournament
Tournament
Baseball in New Jersey
College sports in New Jersey
Sports in Trenton, New Jersey